This is a list of lists of the municipalities of Spain. The municipalities list links are listed below, by autonomous community and province.

According to the provisional reports released on 1 January 2018, there is a total of 8,124 municipalities in Spain, including the autonomous cities of Ceuta and Melilla. Burgos is the province with the most municipalities (371) and Las Palmas the one with the least (34).

Notes:
*Single-province autonomous communities.

Ranked lists of Spanish municipalities

See also
 Municipalities of Spain
 List of metropolitan areas in Spain by population
 List of submerged places in Spain

References

Topónimo en castellano según: Celdrán Gomáriz, Pancracio: Diccionario de topónimos españoles y sus gentilicios. Espasa Calpe, 2002. 

Spain geography-related lists
Subdivisions of Spain
Spain
Spain